Danyo "Dibuba" Ilunga (born January 31, 1987) is a Congolese-German Muay Thai kickboxer currently competing in GLORY. Ilunga is a four-time kickboxing and Muay Thai world champion - most notably being the former It's Showtime 95MAX World Champion. As of November 2021, Combat Press ranks him as the #9 light heavyweight kickboxer in the world.

Background
Ilunga was born in the Democratic Republic of Congo as one of seven children. The son of a prominent politician and the grandson of a local chief, the family had to flee due to the recurring conflict in the Democratic Republic of the Congo, resettling in Germany. A fan of martial arts films starring actors such as Jean-Claude Van Damme and Jackie Chan, Ilunga's main motivation to compete in kickboxing was watching the legendary Remy Bonjasky's fights. In 2007 at the age of 19, Ilunga took up kickboxing under the tutelage of K-1 Germany 2003 Champion and now trainer, Asmir Burgic. Ilunga would go on to train with Bonjasky himself. Ilunga's father, who later became a pastor, did not initially approve of Ilunga's career path, but his viewpoint switched after seeing his son win multiple titles and have a wealth of success in the sport.

Kickboxing career
After winning several domestic titles Ilunga entered the four man "1-King" Muay Thai Tournament in Bamberg, defeating both of his opponents on the night by stoppage to claim the Super Heavyweight Championship. He followed up this victory the next year by claiming the vacant W.K.A. European Championship by defeating Tomi Colic, a late replacement for original opponent Roland Dabinovci, in what was a competitive fight.

By the end of 2009, Ilunga won his first world title beating Jochen Gieb by TKO in the third to claim the I.M.C. belt. He then followed his trainer and mentor Asmir Burgic by winning the German King Cup later that year (Burgic had won the previous edition) and retained his I.M.C. world title later that year by easily stopping his Turkish opponent in the first round. After an extensive winning streak on the local scene, beating fighters such as Karl Glischynski, Danyo lost his first match in a while, dropping a decision to the Dutch based Angolan Henriques Zowa. Unused to defeat, Danyo had a chance to make up for this setback in Leverkusen facing previous foe Karl Glischynski for the I.K.B.O. world title recently vacated by Florian Ogunade. Danyo won the rematch in spectacular fashion, stopping Glischynski in the second with a knee/punch combination to become the new world champion.

In 2011 Danyo, who had recently been training with x3 time K-1 world champion Remy Bonjasky, was called up to make his It's Showtime debut against Wendell Roche for the vacant 95MAX world title recently held by Tyrone Spong. Coming into the fight relatively unheard of outside of Germany, Danyo outworked It's Showtime regular Wendell Roche over five rounds, scoring well with counterattacks to frustrate Roche and gain the unanimous decision victory and the It's Showtime world title belt.

He faced Ali Cenik at Glory 2: Brussels on October 6, 2012, in Brussels, Belgium and won via unanimous decision.

He beat Florian Ogunade bt TKO in round three at the Get in the Ring event in Hamburg, Germany on November 3, 2012.

He KO'd Stephane Susperregui with a second round flying knee at Glory 5: London on March 23, 2013, in London, England.

He went into the Glory 9: New York - 2013 95kg Slam in New York City on June 22, 2013, as the #1 ranked 95 kg fighter in Glory's internal rankings. Ilunga took a wide unanimous decision over Mourad Bouzidi in the quarter-finals before going up against Dustin Jacoby in the semis. The American rookie put up a good fight in round one but Ilunga pulled away in the last two rounds with his low kicks. A highly anticipated match with Tyrone Spong awaited him in the final but it ended in a controversial and anticlimactic fashion. As the fight began, both fighters met in the center of the ring and Spong unloaded a flurry of punches. As Ilunga covered up and prepared to counter, referee Mufadel Elghazaoui jumped in and stopped the fight, giving Spong the TKO win at just sixteen seconds of the first round. Although, it was later revealed that there was a "no standing eight count" rule in effect at the event as per the New York State Athletic Commission's regulations, the stoppage was still deemed premature by much of the kickboxing community.

Ilunga defeated Michael Duut by first-round TKO at Glory 11: Chicago - Heavyweight World Championship Tournament in Hoffman Estates, Illinois, US on October 12, 2013.

He knocked out Andrei Stoica in the first round of the tournament reserve bout at GLORY 15 - Light Heavyweight World Championship Tournament in Istanbul, Turkey on April 12, 2014. The two had spirited exchanges in the first round. Ilunga was consistent with his piercing knees to Stoica, who countered them well with his right hand. Both men were successful and landed hard shots. Stoica thought that he had an advantage on a particular combination but just grazed Ilunga with a hook instead of landing clean. This allowed Ilunga to get underneath it and come back with a huge counter right hand that floored and took Stoica out, who didn't have his feet beneath him to answer the ten count.

In February 2015 Ilunga signed for Croatia's Final Fight Championship promotion.

On the 2nd of October, 2021, Ilunga defeated Piotr Ramankevich at Stekos Fight Night at the Circus Krone in Munich. Shortly after, he announced his retirement from the sport on Instagram.

Titles
2016 Glory Fight of the Year 
2013 Glory 95kg Slam Tournament Runner-up
2011–2013 It's Showtime 95MAX world champion -95 kg (2 title defences)
2010 I.K.B.O. Muaythai heavyweight world champion -95 kg
2010 I.M.C. Muaythai world champion -95 kg (1st title defence)
2009 German King Cup (K-1 rules) heavyweight tournament champion +95 kg
2009 I.M.C. Muaythai world champion -95 kg
2009 W.K.A. (K-1 rules) heavyweight European champion -95 kg
2008 "1-King" International (K-1 rules) super heavyweight tournament champion +100 kg
IFMA national German champion

Kickboxing record

|-
|-  bgcolor="#CCFFCC"
| 2021-10-02 || Win ||align=left| Petr Romankevich  || Steko's Fight Club || Germany || Decision || 5 ||3:00|
|-
|-  bgcolor="#CCFFCC"
| 2019-10-03 || Win ||align=left| Brian Douwes  || Steko's Fight Club || Germany || Decision || 5 ||3:00|
|-  bgcolor="#CCFFCC"
| 2019-06-19 || Win ||align=left| Fred Sikking  || Steko's Fight Club || Germany || KO (Right Hook) || 2 || 1:24
|-   bgcolor="#FFBBBB"
| 2018-12-01|| Loss ||align=left| James McSweeney || Mix Fight Gala 25 || Germany || KO (Spinning Backfist)|| 3 ||
|-   bgcolor="#FFBBBB"
| 2018-08-10 || Loss ||align=left| Artem Vakhitov || Glory 56: Denver || Broomfield, Colorado, USA || Decision (unanimous)|| 5 || 3:00 
|-
! style=background:white colspan=9 |
|-
|-  bgcolor="#CCFFCC"
| 2018-06-02 || Win ||align=left| Fraser Weightman  || Glory 54: Birmingham || Birmingham, England || Decision (Unanimous) || 3 || 3:00
|-  bgcolor="#CCFFCC"
| 2017-12-09 || Win ||align=left| Michael Duut  || Glory 49: Rotterdam || Rotterdam, Netherlands || KO (Punch) || 3 || 2:26
|-  bgcolor="#FFBBBB"
| 2017-08-04 || Loss ||align=left| Stéphane Susperregui  || Fight Night Saint-Tropez || France || Decision (Unanimous) || 3 || 3:00
|-  bgcolor="#FFBBBB"
| 2017-02-24 || Loss ||align=left| Ariel Machado || Glory 38: Chicago, Semi Finals || Hoffman Estates, Illinois, USA || Decision (unanimous) || 3 || 3:00  
|-
|-  bgcolor="#FFBBBB"
| 2016-12-10 || Loss||align=left| Michael Duut || Glory 36: Oberhausen || Oberhausen, Germany || Ext. R. Decision (unanimous) || 4 || 3:00
|-  
|-  bgcolor="#FFBBBB"
| 2015-12-04 || Loss ||align=left| Mourad Bouzidi || Glory 26: Amsterdam || Amsterdam, Netherlands || Decision (split) || 3 || 3:00
|-  
|-  bgcolor="#FFBBBB"
| 2015-11-06 || Loss ||align=left| Artem Vakhitov || Glory 25: Milan || Monza, Italy || Decision (unanimous) || 3 || 3:00
|-  
|-  bgcolor="#FFBBBB"
| 2015-08-04 || Loss ||align=left| Alexei Papin || Fight Night Saint-Tropez  || Saint Tropez, France || Decision (unanimous) || 4 || 2:00
|-
|-  bgcolor="#FFBBBB"
| 2015-04-17 || Loss ||align=left| Zabit Samedov || GFC Fight Series 3 - Heavyweight Tournament, Final || Dubai, UAE || Ext.R Decision (Unanimous) || 4 || 3:00
|-
! style=background:white colspan=9 |
|-
|-  bgcolor="#CCFFCC"
| 2015-04-17 || Win ||align=left| Jafar Ahmadi || GFC Fight Series 3 - Heavyweight Tournament, Semi Finals || Dubai, UAE || TKO (referee stoppage) || 2 || 
|-
|-  bgcolor="#FFBBBB"
| 2014-11-07 || Loss ||align=left| Saulo Cavalari || Glory 18: Oklahoma - Light Heavyweight Contender Tournament, Semi Finals || Oklahoma City, Oklahoma, USA || Decision (unanimous) || 3 || 3:00
|-
|-  bgcolor="#CCFFCC"
| 2014-06-12 || Win ||align=left| Ondřej Hutník || Gibu Fight Night  || Prague, Czech Republic || TKO || 3 ||
|-
|-  bgcolor="#CCFFCC"
| 2014-04-12 || Win ||align=left| Andrei Stoica || Glory 15: Istanbul - Light Heavyweight World Championship Tournament, Reserve Match || Istanbul, Turkey || KO (right overhand) || 1 || 2:33
|-
|-  bgcolor="#CCFFCC"
| 2013-10-12 || Win ||align=left| Michael Duut || Glory 11: Chicago || Hoffman Estates, Illinois, USA || TKO (left hook) || 1 || 2:23
|-
|-  bgcolor="#FFBBBB"
| 2013-06-22 || Loss ||align=left| Tyrone Spong || Glory 9: New York - 95 kg Slam Tournament, Final ||New York City, New York, USA || TKO (punches) || 1 || 0:16
|-
! style=background:white colspan=9 |
|-
|-  bgcolor="#CCFFCC"
| 2013-06-22 || Win ||align=left| Dustin Jacoby || Glory 9: New York - 95 kg Slam Tournament, Semi Finals || New York City, New York, USA || Decision (unanimous) || 3 || 3:00
|-
|-  bgcolor="#CCFFCC"
| 2013-06-22 || Win ||align=left| Mourad Bouzidi || Glory 9: New York - 95 kg Slam Tournament, Quarter Finals || New York City, New York, USA || Decision (unanimous) || 3 || 3:00
|-
|-  bgcolor="#CCFFCC" 
| 2013-03-23 || Win ||align=left| Stephane Susperregui || Glory 5: London || London, England || KO (knee) || 2 || 0:21
|-
|-  bgcolor="#CCFFCC" 
| 2012-11-03 || Win ||align=left| Florian Ogunade || Get in the Ring || Hamburg, Germany || TKO (punches) || 3 ||
|-
|-  bgcolor="#CCFFCC" 
| 2012-10-06 ||Win ||align=left| Ali Cenik || Glory 2: Brussels || Brussels, Belgium || Decision (unanimous) || 3 || 3:00
|-
|-  bgcolor="#CCFFCC"
| 2012-09-08 || win ||align=left| Sergio Piqué || Merseburger Fight Night, Final || Merseburg, Germany || KO (left hook) || || 
|-
! style=background:white colspan=9 |
|-
|-  bgcolor="#CCFFCC"
| 2012-09-08 || win ||align=left| Wendell Roche || Merseburger Fight Night, Quarter Finals || Merseburg, Germany || Decision || 3 || 3:00
|-
|-  bgcolor="#CCFFCC"
| 2012-06-30 || win ||align=left| Filip Verlinden || Music Hall & BFN Group present: It's Showtime 57 & 58 || Brussels, Belgium || Decision (split) || 5 || 3:00
|-
! style=background:white colspan=9 |
|-
|-  bgcolor="#CCFFCC"
| 2011-11-12 || Win ||align=left| Loren Javier Jorge ||  It's Showtime 53 || Tenerife, Spain || Decision (Unanimous) || 5 || 3:00
|-
! style=background:white colspan=9 |
|-
|-  bgcolor="#CCFFCC"
| 2011-09-17 || Win ||align=left| Mohamed Boubkari || Thailand vs Europe || Stuttgart, Germany || 2 Ext. R. Decision (Unanimous) || 5 || 3:00
|-
|-  bgcolor="#CCFFCC"
| 2011-06-11 || Win ||align=left| Nenad Pagonis || BFN Group presents: It's Showtime Warsaw || Warsaw, Poland || TKO (Referee Stoppage) || 4 || 1:13
|-
! style=background:white colspan=9 |
|-
|-  bgcolor="#CCFFCC"
| 2011-03-06 || Win ||align=left| Wendell Roche || It's Showtime Sporthallen Zuid || Amsterdam, Netherlands || Decision (Unanimous) || 5 || 3:00 
|-
! style=background:white colspan=9 |
|-
|-  bgcolor="#CCFFCC"
| 2010-12-11 || Win ||align=left| Karl Glischynski || Masters Fight Night || Leverkusen, Germany || KO (Knee & Punches) || 2 ||
|-
! style=background:white colspan=9 |
|-
|-  bgcolor="#CCFFCC"
| 2010-11-14 || Win ||align=left| Bob van Boxmeer || Thailand vs. Challenger Series: Thailand vs. Germany || Ulm, Germany || Decision (Unanimous) || 3 || 3:00
|-
|-  bgcolor="#FFBBBB"
| 2010-10-09 || Loss ||align=left| Henriques Zowa || Mix Fight Gala 10 || Darmstadt, Germany || TKO (Referee Stoppage) || 3 || 
|-
|-  bgcolor="#CCFFCC"
| 2010-07-04 || Win ||align=left| Serkan Öztürk || Backstreet Fights IV || Cologne, Germany || KO || 1 ||
|-
|-  bgcolor="#CCFFCC"
| 2010-05-08 || Win ||align=left| Karl Glischynski || Rostock Fight Night || Rostock, Germany || TKO (Cut) || 3 ||
|-
|-  bgcolor="#CCFFCC"
| 2010-04-17 || Win ||align=left| Ayhan Kazankaya || Night Fighting || Waldbröl, Germany || KO (Punches) || 1 ||
|-
! style=background:white colspan=9 |
|-
|-  bgcolor="#CCFFCC"
| 2010-04-04 || Win ||align=left| Revanho Blokland || S-8 Thaiboxing || Wuppertal, Germany || KO || 1 ||
|-
|-  bgcolor="#CCFFCC"
| 2009-11-14 || Win ||align=left| Dennis Sebastian || Germany Kings Cup Round III, Final || Rostock, Germany || KO || 3 ||
|-
! style=background:white colspan=9 |
|-
|-  bgcolor="#CCFFCC"
| 2009-11-14 || Win ||align=left| Moritz Schacht || Germany Kings Cup Round III, Semi Final || Rostock, Germany || TKO || 2 ||
|-
|-  bgcolor="#CCFFCC"
| 2009-10-10 || Win ||align=left| Jochen Gieb || Fight Night Freiburg || Freiburg, Germany || TKO (Ref Stop/3 Knockdowns) || 3 ||
|-
! style=background:white colspan=9 |
|-
|-  bgcolor="#CCFFCC"
| 2009-06-13 || Win ||align=left| Tomi Colic || Weidener Fight Night || Weiden, Germany || TKO (Retirement) || 4 || 3:00 
|-
! style=background:white colspan=9 |
|-
|-  bgcolor="#FFBBBB"
| 2009-03-21 || Loss ||align=left| Anderson "Braddock" Silva || VIP Fight Night 2009, Quarter Final || Neuss, Germany || KO (Punches) || 2 || 2:07
|-
|-  bgcolor="#CCFFCC"
| 2008-12-13 || Win ||align=left| Jan Müller || The Champions Club Germany '08, Final || Bamberg, Germany || KO (Right Punch) || 2 ||
|-
! style=background:white colspan=9 |
|-
|-  bgcolor="#CCFFCC"
| 2008-12-13 || Win ||align=left| Mutlu Karabulut || The Champions Club Germany '08, Semi Final || Bamberg, Germany || TKO (Ref Stoppage) || 2 ||
|-
|-  bgcolor="#CCFFCC"
| 2008-?-? || Win ||align=left| Patrick Kolbe || || Germany || TKO (Ref Stop/Punch) || 2 ||
|-
|-
| colspan=9 | Legend:

See also 
List of It's Showtime events
List of It's Showtime champions
List of male kickboxers

References

External links
Danyo "Dibuba" Ilunga (Official Website - In German)

1987 births
Living people
Sportspeople from Kinshasa
Democratic Republic of the Congo male kickboxers
German male kickboxers
Heavyweight kickboxers
Democratic Republic of the Congo Muay Thai practitioners
German Muay Thai practitioners
Democratic Republic of the Congo male mixed martial artists
German male mixed martial artists
Mixed martial artists utilizing Muay Thai
Democratic Republic of the Congo emigrants to Germany
Luba people
Glory kickboxers